

Winners and nominees

2010s

References

External links 
TVyNovelas at esmas.com
TVyNovelas Awards at the univision.com

Awards disestablished in 2016
Multiplatform
Multiplatform
Multiplatform
Awards established in 2014